Carelli is an Italian surname. Notable people with the surname include:

Anthony Carelli, Canadian professional wrestler known as "Santino Marella"
Beniamino Carelli, Italian composer and singing teacher
Emilio Carelli, Italian journalist
Emma Carelli, Italian operatic soprano
Francesco Carelli, Italian numismatist and archaeologist
Gabor Carelli, Hungarian operatic tenor 
Rick Carelli, American racecar driver
Family of Italian painters:
Consalvo Carelli
Gabriele Carelli
Giuseppe Carelli
Raffaele Carelli

Italian-language surnames